The 1889 Yale Bulldogs football team represented Yale University in the 1889 college football season. In their second season under head coach Walter Camp, Yale compiled a 15–1 record, held opponents scoreless in 12 games, and outscored all opponents by a total of 664 to 31. Its only loss was in the final game of the season against rival Princeton by a 10–0 score.

Three Yale players (end Amos Alonzo Stagg, guard Pudge Heffelfinger and tackle Charles O. Gill) were named to the 1889 College Football All-America Team, the first college football All-America team as selected by Caspar Whitney. Stagg and Heffelfinger have also been inducted into the College Football Hall of Fame.

Schedule

References

Yale
Yale Bulldogs football seasons
Yale Bulldogs football